Pixelface is a CBBC children's sitcom. The programme followed the adventures of a group of video game characters, previously seen in the Backstage Access sketches in the programme Sorry, I've Got No Head.

The characters include: Aethelwynne, a snobbish elf from the questing game 'Sword of the Ancients'; Rex Dynamo, an unknown marsupial/squirrel hybrid whose game of the same name centres on the collection of apples; Claireparker, a zombie-battling waitress from the game 'Return to Zombie City'; Alexia, a lion-dodging Lara Croft parody from the game 'Legend Hunter'; Kiki Nova, an enthusiastic character from a dance game 'Groove Academy 2', which is often belittled by the other characters, and Sergeant Riley, an alien-shooting army sergeant from the game 'Sentient Force', often accompanied by his robot friend Romford.

Cast

References

External links
 

2011 British television series debuts
2012 British television series endings
2010s British children's television series
BBC high definition shows
BBC television comedy
British children's fantasy television series
British television comedy
British television shows featuring puppetry
2010s British teen sitcoms
Television series by ITV Studios
English-language television shows